Westbury-on-Severn is a rural village in England that is the centre of the large, rural parish, also called Westbury-on-Severn.

Location

The village is situated on the A48 road (between Minsterworth and Newnham on Severn) and bounded by the River Severn to the south and west. Westbury is also bounded to the West by the Newport to Gloucester railway line, although Westbury does not have a railway station, the closest stations being Gloucester and Lydney.

Westbury is just over a mile long and has one only housing estate to the south of the main A48 road which was constructed in the 1980s. The village also has a primary school, post office cum village store, a pub "The Lyon" and dentist surgery. 
Geoff Sterry, a coal and solid fuel merchant, is also based in the village.

Westbury falls within the District of the Forest of Dean although the forest itself does not extend to the village.

The village has a large parish church, which is distinctive, as the steeple is not attached to the main building because of a fire which burned down the old wooden building soon after the new steeple was completed. Within the porch of the church are several markings of crosses and full crosses made during the English Civil War. The north porch and north aisle are the oldest parts of the church, having been built around 1290.

Just to the East of the village centre is the National Trust owned Westbury Court Garden.

Transport Links

The village is served by three regular bus services, operated by Stagecoach: the 22 service between Coleford in the Forest of Dean and Gloucester and by the 23 service between Lydney and Gloucester.

Notable people
See :Category:People from Westbury-on-Severn

See also
 Westbury Court Garden

References

External links
photos of Westbury-on-Severn and surrounding area on geograph

Villages in Gloucestershire
Forest of Dean
Civil parishes in Gloucestershire